Uttara, which means "north" in Sanskrit and many other South Asian languages, may refer to:

Places
Uttara Export Processing Zone, Bangladesh
Uttara, a suburb north of Dhaka, Bangladesh
Uttara East Thana
Uttara West Thana
Uttaradit, a city in Thailand
Uttara Kannada, a district in Karnataka state
Uttarakhand, a Himalayan state in North India
Uttarakuru, a legendary location in ancient Indian texts
Uttarapatha, a legendary location in ancient Indian texts

Films
Uttara (film), a 2000 Bengali film
Uttarayan (film), a 2004 Marathi film
Uttarayanam, a 1975 Malayalam film

People
 Uttara Baokar, Indian actress
 Uttara Mhatre Kher (born 1963), Indian model

Other uses
Uttara (Mahabharata), son of King Virata who went into battle with Arjuna
Uttarā (Mahabharata), daughter of Virata and mother of Parikshita
Uttara Bank, Bangladesh
Uttara University, Dhaka, Bangladesh
Uttaradhi Arora, an Arora clan of North India
Uttaramadra, a legendary clan found in Uttarakuru
Uttara Foods and Feeds, an Indian company
Uttarayana, spring equinox in Hindu traditions

See also
 Utara (disambiguation)
 Uttar (disambiguation)
 Uttara-kuru (disambiguation)